The enzyme synephrine dehydratase catalyzes the chemical reaction

(R)-synephrine  (4-hydroxyphenyl)acetaldehyde + methylamine

This enzyme belongs to the family of lyases, specifically the hydro-lyases, which cleave carbon-oxygen bonds.  The systematic name of this enzyme class is (R)-synephrine hydro-lyase (methylamine-forming).

References

 

EC 4.2.1
Enzymes of unknown structure